Torņakalns Station is a railway station in the neighbourhood of Torņakalns in Riga, Latvia, located on the western bank of the Daugava River.

Torņakalns Station is located on the Riga–Jelgava and Riga–Tukums railway lines. The station opened in 1868 as the northern terminus of the Riga–Jelgava railway line. From 1872, however, all trains were continued from the station via the Iron Bridge across the Daugava to the current Riga Central Station. In 1877, Torņakalns Station also became the eastern terminus of the Torņakalns–Tukums railway line.

History  
The terminal of Riga–Jelgava Railway, was opened in 1868 and called Riga-Mitauer Bahnhof back then.   This was a very important station, which secured the connection of Riga with Zemgale, but in 1872  one year after construction of the railway bridge across the Daugava, it lost its significance and was renamed Riga III, and later  Riga III Commodity Station, which was part of the joint Torņakalns station.  The Jelgava station was located north of the present Torņakalns station between Uzvaras Boulevard and Akmeņu Street.  Nowadays the old station building is partly preserved at Akmeņu street 19 (the former address - Akmeņu iela 38) as a dwelling house.  In 1877, trains running along the new line Riga-Tukums line began to stop in Torņakalns.  The present station building was built in the middle of the 1980s.   In 1950, after the electrification of the Riga-Dubulti railway section, electric trains began to stop in Tornakalns.  In December 1972, the Riga-Jelgava line was electrified  and the electric trains in that direction was in service as well.  By August 15, 2001, the diesel train Riga-Liepaja was decommissioned.  As of February 15, 2010, the diesel train Riga-Reņģe was continued to operate every day.

See also 
Torņakalns Memorial to Victims of Communist Terror

References

External links

Railway stations in Riga
Railway stations opened in 1868